The DE postcode area, also known as the Derby postcode area, is a group of 23 postcode districts in central England, within 11 post towns. These cover south and central Derbyshire (including Derby, Alfreton, Ashbourne, Bakewell, Belper, Heanor, Ilkeston, Matlock, Ripley and Swadlincote), parts of east Staffordshire (including Burton upon Trent) and north-west Leicestershire, and very small parts of Nottinghamshire.



Coverage
The approximate coverage of the postcode districts:

|-
! DE1
| DERBY
| Derby city centre
| Derby
|-
! DE3
| DERBY
| Derby (Mickleover)
| Derby, South Derbyshire
|-
! DE4 
| MATLOCK
| Sector 2:Darley Dale, Beeley, Rowsley, Winster, Darley Bridge, Elton, BonsallSector 3:Matlock, Matlock Bath, CromfordSector 4: Middleton-by-Wirksworth, Wirksworth, BolehillSector 5: Crich, Holloway, Lea, Tansley
|Derbyshire Dales, Amber Valley
|-
! DE5
| RIPLEY
| Ripley, Codnor, Denby, Waingroves, Butterley, Pentrich
| Amber Valley
|-
! DE6
| ASHBOURNE
| Ashbourne, Hulland Ward,  Weston Underwood
| Derbyshire Dales, Amber Valley, South Derbyshire, Derby, East Staffordshire
|-
! DE7
| ILKESTON
| Horsley Woodhouse, Ilkeston, Morley, West Hallam
| Erewash, Amber Valley, Broxtowe
|-
! DE11
| SWADLINCOTE
| Swadlincote, Church Gresley, Woodville, Newhall, Hartshorne, Castle Gresley, Blackfordby, Albert Village
| South Derbyshire, North West Leicestershire
|-
! DE12
| SWADLINCOTE
| Appleby Magna, Donisthorpe, Linton, Measham, Overseal, Rosliston, Walton-on-Trent
| North West Leicestershire, South Derbyshire
|-
! DE13
| BURTON-ON-TRENT
| Alrewas, Barton-under-Needwood, Rolleston on Dove, Tutbury
| East Staffordshire, Lichfield
|-
! DE14
| BURTON-ON-TRENT
| Branston, Burton upon Trent, Newton Solney, Winshill
| East Staffordshire, South Derbyshire
|-
! DE15
| BURTON-ON-TRENT
| Bretby, Stapenhill
| East Staffordshire, South Derbyshire
|-
! DE21
| DERBY
| Derby (Chaddesden, Oakwood, Spondon); Breadsall, Horsley, Little Eaton
| Derby, Erewash, Amber Valley
|-
! DE22
| DERBY
| Derby (Allestree, Darley Abbey, Mackworth (estate)); Kedleston, Mackworth (village), Quarndon
| Derby, Amber Valley
|-
! DE23
| DERBY
| Derby (Heatherton Village, Littleover, Normanton, Pear Tree, Sunny Hill) Highfields suburb
| Derby, South Derbyshire
|-
! DE24
| DERBY
| Derby (Allenton, Alvaston, Boulton, Osmaston, Shelton Lock, Sinfin, Wilmorton); Stenson Fields
| Derby, South Derbyshire
|-
! DE45
| BAKEWELL
| Ashford-in-the-Water, Bakewell, Baslow, Chatsworth, Edensor, Hassop, Monyash, Youlgreave
| Derbyshire Dales
|-
! DE55
| ALFRETON
| Sector 1: SwanwickSectors 2 and 3: Alfreton, South Normanton Sector 4: Riddings, Greenhill Lane, Leabrooks, SomercotesSector 5: Tibshelf, Newton, Blackwell, HilcoteSector 6: Wessington, Higham, Stonebroom, Morton, ShirlandSector 7: Alfreton, South Wingfield
| Amber Valley, Bolsover
|-
! DE56
| BELPER
| Ambergate, Belper, Duffield, Heage, Holbrook, Kilburn, Milford
| Amber Valley
|-
! DE65
| DERBY
| Burnaston, Egginton, Etwall, Findern, Hatton, Hilton, Milton, Repton, Willington
| South Derbyshire
|-
! DE72
| DERBY
| Ambaston, Aston-on-Trent, Borrowash, Breaston, Church Wilne, Draycott, Elvaston, Ockbrook, Risley, Shardlow, Weston-on-Trent
| Erewash, South Derbyshire, North West Leicestershire
|-
! DE73
| DERBY
| Derby (Chellaston); Barrow upon Trent, Ingleby, Melbourne, Stanton by Bridge, Swarkestone, Ticknall
| Derby, South Derbyshire
|-
! DE74
| DERBY
| Castle Donington, Kegworth, Diseworth, Hemington, Lockington, East Midlands Airport
| North West Leicestershire, Rushcliffe
|-
! DE75
| HEANOR
| Heanor, Loscoe, Shipley
| Amber Valley
|-
! style="background:#FFFaFFF;"|DE99
| style="background:#FFFFFF;"|DERBY
| style="background:#FFFFFF;"|
| style="background:#FFFFFF;"|non-geographic
|}

Map

See also
List of postcode areas in the United Kingdom
Postcode Address File

References

External links
Royal Mail's Postcode Address File
A quick introduction to Royal Mail's Postcode Address File (PAF)

Derby
Postcode areas covering the East Midlands